Sariar may refer to:
Apaven, Armenia
Mets Sariar, Armenia
Pokr Sariar, Armenia